Tessa Knaven (born 4 December 1971 in Arnhem) is a Dutch rower. She finished sixth in the women's eight at the 1996 Summer Olympics.

External links 
 
 

1971 births
Living people
Dutch female rowers
Sportspeople from Arnhem
Rowers at the 1996 Summer Olympics
Olympic rowers of the Netherlands
World Rowing Championships medalists for the Netherlands
20th-century Dutch women
21st-century Dutch women